Brendale is a suburb in the Moreton Bay Region, Queensland, Australia.

Geography
Brendale is north of Brisbane, the state capital, located immediately south of Strathpine on the South Pine River.

Brendale is mostly an industrial suburb, although several parks exist within it. It contains a Powerlink 275/110 kV electrical transmission substation called South Pine Substation, as well as a waste treatment plant.

History
Brendale is situated in the Yugarabul traditional Indigenous Australian country.

The origin of the suburb's name is from the name given to a horse stud, established by the property developer, property marketer and business owner William (Bill) Bowden in the early 1960s.

Wantima Country Club opened on 14 February 1969 with a 6-hole golf course.

The median age of the Brendale population was 34 years, 3 years below the national median of 37. 65.3% of people living in Brendale were born in Australia. The other top responses for country of birth were New Zealand 10%, India 3.8%, England 3.5%, Philippines 1.5%, Fiji 0.9%. 83% of people spoke only English at home; the next most common languages were 1.8% Punjabi, 0.9% Tagalog, 0.9% Hindi, 0.8% Shona, 0.8% Japanese.

Amenities 
Brendale is an industrial, light industrial, commercial, business, retail and service centre in the Strathpine area for the north metropolitan Brisbane and wider communities. The Bunya Park Drive Convenience Centre, containing the Eatons Hill Hotel and Function Centre in Brendale is a trade, enterprise, retail and services zone providing services for the neighbouring Albany Creek, Eatons Hill and wider communities.

Sporting facilities 
The South Pine Sports Complex has sporting facilities for a wide array of sports.

Wantima Country Club has an 18-hole golf course. It is where Cameron Smith, winner of the 150th British Open learned to play.

Education 
There are no schools in Brendale. The nearest primary schools are in neighbouring Strathpine, Bald Hills, and Eatons Hill. The nearest secondary schools are in Strathpine, Albany Creek and Bray Park.

References

External links

 

Suburbs of Moreton Bay Region